Georg Restle (born 1965 in Esslingen am Neckar) is a German journalist and television presenter.

Life 
Restle studied law at University of Freiburg and international law at London School of Economics. He works as journalist for German broadcaster WDR. He presents German political magazine Monitor.

References 

German journalists
German male journalists
German television presenters
1965 births
Living people
ARD (broadcaster) people
Westdeutscher Rundfunk people